Dave Robicheaux (pronounced "ROW-bih-show") is a fictional character in a series of mystery novels by American crime writer James Lee Burke. He first appeared in The Neon Rain (1987).

Biography
A former homicide detective in the New Orleans Police Department, Robicheaux lives in New Iberia, Louisiana, and works as a detective for the Iberia Parish Sheriff's Office. He is a recovering alcoholic whose demons stem from his service as a U.S. Army lieutenant in the Vietnam War and his impoverished, difficult childhood in rural Louisiana; his mother abandoned the family and was later murdered and his father died in an oil rig explosion.

He still experiences periods of major depressive disorder and nightmares, which are only exacerbated by the murder of his wife Annie Ballard, a social worker. He married a mobster's widow, Bootsie, a lupus sufferer, and adopted an El Salvadorean orphan Alafair (the namesake of Burke's own daughter), after he saves her from the wreckage of an airplane. After Bootsie's death, he marries Molly, a former nun. He was also married to a fourth woman, Nicole, before the book series start.

His best friend is violent, alcoholic, ex-police officer, private investigator, and bail bondsman Cletus Purcel.

Robicheaux is described as 54 years old in the introduction to the Recorded Books CD edition of Black Cherry Blues (the third book in the series, published in 1989), but in the third track of the audiobook, Robicheaux describes himself as 49 years old. In the fourth audio track, Robicheaux introduces Dixie Lee Pugh, "my freshman roommate at Southwest Louisiana Institute in 1956," which would put his birth year around 1938 if he enrolled when he was 18.

Novels
The Neon Rain (1987)
Heaven's Prisoners (1988)
Black Cherry Blues (1989)
A Morning for Flamingos (1990)
A Stained White Radiance (1992)
In the Electric Mist with Confederate Dead (1993)
Dixie City Jam (1994)
Burning Angel (1995)
Cadillac Jukebox (1996)
Sunset Limited (1998)
Purple Cane Road (2000)
Jolie Blon's Bounce (2002)
Last Car to Elysian Fields (2003)
Crusader's Cross (2005)
Pegasus Descending (2006)
The Tin Roof Blowdown (2007)
Swan Peak (2008)
The Glass Rainbow (2010)
Creole Belle (2012)
Light of the World (2013)
Robicheaux (2018)
The New Iberia Blues (2019)
A Private Cathedral (2020)

Appearances in movies
Robicheaux is played by Alec Baldwin in Heaven's Prisoners and by Tommy Lee Jones in In the Electric Mist.

References

Characters in mystery novel series
Fictional alcohol abusers
Fictional American police officers
Fictional Cajuns
Fictional characters from New Orleans
Fictional military lieutenants
Fictional private investigators
Fictional United States Army personnel
Fictional Vietnam War veterans
Literary characters introduced in 1987